was a Japanese philanthropist, entrepreneur and the founder of Kyocera and KDDI. He was the chairman of Japan Airlines.

Inamori was elected as a member into the National Academy of Engineering in 2000 for innovation in ceramic materials and solar cell development/manufacturing, entrepreneurship of advanced technologies, and for being a role model for relating science to society.

In 2011, he received the Othmer Gold Medal for outstanding contributions to progress in science and chemistry.

Biography 

Kazuo Inamori was born 21 January 1932 in Kagoshima, on the island of Kyushu in Japan. Inamori graduated from Kagoshima University in 1955 with a Bachelor of Science degree in applied chemistry.  He became a researcher at Shofu Industries in Kyoto, Japan.  There he was important in several developments, developing fosterite as an insulator for high frequency radio waves; using fosterite for the mass production of high frequency insulator components; and developing an electric tunnel kiln for use in sintering.

In 1959, Inamori and several other colleagues established Kyoto Ceramic, later known as Kyocera. The company manufactured high-frequency insulator components for television picture tubes for Matsushita Electronics Industries (later Panasonic) in Japan, and silicon transistor headers for Fairchild Semiconductor and ceramic substrates for IBM in the United States.  At Kyocera, Inamori implemented his Amoeba Management system.

After deregulation of Japan’s telecommunications industry in 1984, Inamori founded Daini Denden (DDI) Corporation.  DDI later entered the cell phone business, merging with KDD (Kokusai Denshin Denwa) and IDO (Nippon Idou Tsushin Corporation) in 2000 to form KDDI, which has grown to become Japan's second-largest telecommunication services provider.

At the age of 77, Inamori became the CEO of Japan Airlines when it entered bankruptcy protection on 19 January 2010, and led the air carrier through its restructuring, eventually allowing the company to re-list on the Tokyo Stock Exchange in November 2012. Inamori has been an International Advisor of Goldman Sachs Group, Inc.

Philanthropy
Inamori, who was a Zen Buddhist priest, established the Inamori Foundation in 1984, which awards the annual Kyoto Prize to honor those who have made "extraordinary contributions to science, civilization, and the spirituality of humankind."

In 2005, the Alfred University School of Engineering (Alfred, NY) was renamed in honor of Dr. Inamori. He endowed the Inamori Scholarship fund in 1996, doubling the fund in 2004. In Dr. Inamori's honor, the Kyocera Corporation has given a $10 million endowment to enable expansion of the Kazuo Inamori School of Engineering's research faculty.

In 2005, Inamori helped to establish the Inamori International Center for Ethics and Excellence at Case Western Reserve University (Cleveland, Ohio), with a gift of  $10 million.  The center awards the Inamori Ethics Prize to those who serve as examples of ethical leadership and make significant contributions to the betterment of global society.

Awards and honors
Inamori has received many awards and honors, including:
 Honorary Doctorate from Kagoshima University, 1999
 Honorary Doctor of Science from Alfred University, 1988 
 Honorary Doctorate from Kyushu University, 2006
 Honorary Doctorate from Kyoto Institute of Technology, 2010
 International Citizens Award, Japan America Society of Southern California, 2011
 Honorary Doctorate of Science, San Diego State University
 Othmer Gold Medal, 2011
 Honorary Knight Commander of the Order of the British Empire, 2019

References

External links 

 
 Inamori Foundation
  
 
 

1932 births
2022 deaths
Kyocera
KDDI
Japan Airlines
Japanese chief executives
Kagoshima University alumni
People from Kagoshima
Goldman Sachs people
Honorary Knights Commander of the Order of the British Empire
Japanese Zen Buddhists
Zen Buddhist priests